Brenda Walsh may refer to:

Brenda Walsh (sprinter) (born 1952), Canadian athlete
Brenda Walsh (Beverly Hills, 90210), TV character portrayed by Shannen Doherty